The 1945 Yugoslav Women's Basketball League is the 1st season of the Yugoslav Women's Basketball League, the highest professional basketball league in Yugoslavia for women's. Championships is played in 1945 in Subotica and played two teams. Champion for this season is national team of SR Serbia.

Result

External links
 History of league

Yugoslav Women's Basketball League seasons
Women
1945 in women's basketball
basketball